Mark W. Johnson is co-founder and senior partner at Innosight, a growth strategy consulting firm, which he co-founded with Clayton Christensen in 2000.

Johnson has delivered keynotes and written extensively on growth strategy. He is known as the originator of “future-back” strategy development. Most recently, he is the coauthor of the forthcoming book "Lead from the Future: How to Turn Visionary Thinking into Breakthrough Growth" (April, 2020), a manifesto for “Future Back” thinking and a hands-on guide to long-term planning, strategy development, and execution within established organizations. He is also the author of the book "Reinvent Your Business Model: How to Seize the White Space for Transformative Growth" (July, 2018), a guide to building a business model innovation capability at an organization, and coauthor of "Dual Transformation: How to Reposition Today's Business While Creating the Future" (April, 2017), a blueprint for how successful companies can leverage disruptive change to fortify today’s business and create tomorrow’s growth engine.

Johnson’s work has focused on helping companies envision and create new growth strategies, manage transformation, and achieve renewal through business model innovation. This work is the subject of the McKinsey award-winning Harvard Business Review article, “Reinventing Your Business Model,” the business book Seizing the White Space: Business Model Innovation for Growth and Renewal, as well as his forthcoming book Dual Transformation: How to Reposition Today's Business and Create the Future, published by Harvard Business Press, 2017.
 
Prior to co-founding Innosight, Johnson was a consultant at Booz Allen Hamilton. Before that, he served as a nuclear power-trained surface warfare officer in the U.S. Navy.

Johnson received an MBA from the Harvard Business School, a master's degree in civil engineering and engineering mechanics from Columbia University, and a bachelor's degree in aerospace engineering from the United States Naval Academy. Johnson previously sat on the Board of the United States Naval Institute. He and his wife, Jane Clayson Johnson, and their children live in Belmont, Massachusetts.

Journal articles 
 Institutionalizing Innovation Anthony, Scott D.; Johnson, Mark W.; Sinfield, Joseph V. (January 2008), MIT Sloan Management Review. 
 Reinventing Your Business Model Johnson, Mark W.; Christensen, Clayton M.; Kagermann, Henning (December 2008), Harvard Business Review. 
 New Business Models in Emerging Markets Eyring, Matthew J.; Johnson, Mark W.; Nair, Hari (January 2011), Harvard Business Review.

Books 
 The Innovator's Guide to Growth: Putting Disruptive Innovation to Work Anthony, Scott D.; Johnson, Mark W.; Sinfield, Joseph V.; Altman, Elizabeth J. (2008), Boston, Massachusetts, USA: Harvard Business Review Press, .
 Seizing the White Space: Business Model Innovation for Growth and Renewal Johnson, Mark W. (2010), Boston, Massachusetts, USA: Harvard Business Review Press, .
 Dual Transformation: How to Reposition Today's Business and Create the Future Anthony, Scott D.; Gilbert, Clark; Johnson, Mark W. (2017), Boston, Massachusetts, USA: Harvard Business Review Press, .
 Reinvent Your Business Model: How to Seize the White Space for Transformative Growth Johnson, Mark W. (2018), Boston, Massachusetts, USA: Harvard Business Review Press, .
 Lead from the Future: How to Turn Visionary Thinking Into Breakthrough Growth Johnson, Mark W.; Suskewicz, Josh (2020), Boston, Massachusetts, USA: Harvard Business Review Press, .

References 

Harvard Business School alumni
United States Naval Academy alumni
Columbia School of Engineering and Applied Science alumni
Latter Day Saints from Massachusetts
Converts to Mormonism
Living people
People from Belmont, Massachusetts
Latter Day Saints from New York (state)
Year of birth missing (living people)
Military personnel from Massachusetts